Sergei Rozin (born 13 June 1977) is a professional ice hockey player who is currently playing for Torpedo Nizhny Novgorod in the Kontinental Hockey League (KHL).

External links

Living people
Torpedo Nizhny Novgorod players
1977 births
Russian ice hockey defencemen
Ice hockey people from Saint Petersburg